Clostridium formicaceticum (alternately spelled Clostridium formicoaceticum) is an anaerobic, motile, gram-positive bacterium.

References

External links
 
 
 Type strain of Clostridium formicaceticum at BacDive -  the Bacterial Diversity Metadatabase

Gram-positive bacteria
Bacteria described in 1970
formicaceticum